George William Harris (born 20 October 1949) is a British actor. His notable roles include Kingsley Shacklebolt in the Harry Potter film series, Captain Simon Katanga in Raiders of the Lost Ark and Clive King in the BBC medical drama Casualty, where he was one of the original cast members. He also played real-life Somali warlord Osman Ali Atto in the 2001 film Black Hawk Down.

Life and career
In 2013, he played the Abbot of the Black Friars in a BBC radio adaptation of Neil Gaiman's London fantasy Neverwhere.

Filmography

References

External links

 Video interview at Trailblazers.

1949 births
Living people
British male film actors
British male stage actors
British male television actors
Grenadian male actors
British people of Barbadian descent
Grenadian emigrants to the United Kingdom
Grenadian people of Barbadian descent
20th-century British male actors
21st-century British male actors